Atrium Musicae was an early music ensemble from Madrid, Spain, founded in 1964 by Gregorio Paniagua, a Spanish monk.

Background
Perhaps the group's most famous recording is Musique de la Grèce Antique (Music of Ancient Greece), in which they performed ancient Greek music carefully taken from scattered extant fragments of papyrus. Performing the ancient compositions also meant they had to reconstruct an arsenal of ancient instruments. This ancient music was an important aspect of the group's live performances during a series of acclaimed international tours. Another well-known recording by the group is their 1976 disc Musique Arabo-Andalouse, which delves into the Hispanic-Moslem music of southern Spain and is credited with creating new interest in the genre. From the late 1970s to the early 1980s the group made a series of recordings dealing with 15th and 16th century popular Spanish songs, then shifted their attention to the New World for the album Las Indias de España, a recording of Pre-Columbian music collected from archives.

The group dissolved in the early 1980s. Several members, including Eduardo Paniagua, began solo careers.

Major members
Luis Paniagua
Carlos Paniagua
Eduardo Paniagua
Gregorio Paniagua
Beatriz Amo
Cristina Ubeda
Jesús Greus

Other members
Begoña Olavide
Pablo Cano (musician)
Máximo Pradera
Andreas Prittwitz

Javier Bergia 

Marga Aroca 

Sofia Lopez-Ibor 

Clara Teran

Major recordings
MISSA DE BARCELONA-ARS NOVA S.XIV-y MUSICA PROFANA [LP]
Edigsa AHMC 10-57 (Barcelona, Spain), Harmonia Mundi HMU 10.033 (France)
Recorded: Madrid (Spain), 1971
MÚSICA IUCUNDA (SIGLOS XII AL XVII) [LP]
Hispavox HHS 10-459 (Spain), Erato STU 71098 (France), Melodiya C 10-09899/09900 (USSR)
Recorded: Madrid (Spain), 1976
MUSIQUE ARABO ANDALOUSE [LP]
Harmonia mundi HM 389-04 (France)
Recorded: Carcasonne (France), 1976
TARANTULE-TARANTELLE [LP]
Harmonia mundi HM 379 (France)
Recorded: Carcasonne (France), 1976
DIEGO ORTIZ RECERCADAS [LPx2]
Harmonia mundi HM2393 (France), Victor VIC 2399-0 (Japan)
Recorded: Madrid (Spain) & Provence (France), 1977
MUSIQUE DE LA GRECE ANTIQUE [LP]
Harmonia mundi HM 1015 (France), Victor VIC-28067 (Japan)
Recorded: Provence (France), 1978
THIBAUT DE NAVARRE [LP]
Victor VIC-28137 (Japan)
Recorded: 1978
VILLANCICOS [LP]
Harmonia mundi HM 1025 (France), Victor VIC-28086 (Japan)
Recorded: Forcalquier (France), 1979
LA SPAGNA -XV-XVI-XVII Centuries [LPx2, CD]
BIS LP 163/164 (Sweden)
Recorded: Madrid (Spain), 1980
LAS INDIAS DE ESPAÑA MÚSICA PRECOLOMBINA DE ARCHIVOS DEL VIEJO Y NUEVO MUNDO [LP]
Hispavox S90.463 (Spain)
Recorded: Madrid (Spain), 1981
LA FOLIA- DE LA SPAGNA [LP]
Harmonia mundi HM 1050 (France), Victor VIC-28079 (Japan)
Recorded: Provenza (France), 1982

References
Atrium Musicae de Madrid at answers.com
 ATRIVM MVSICAE
 Discography

Spanish musical groups
Early music groups
Musical groups established in 1964
1964 establishments in Spain